Virgil L. Davis Jr. (born September 18, 1960) is an American record producer / songwriter / musician based in Los Angeles. He recorded albums with DJ U-Neek for Bone Thugs-N-Harmony, earning a Grammy Award for his musician work on the group's hit song, "Tha Crossroads", also the 4× platinum album "The Art Of War", the multi platinum album "BTNHResurrection","Thug World Order" and "Thug Stories", "Strength & Loyalty", and "Uni5: The World's Enemy" and "The Art of War: World War III". He also was a writer / produced and performed on DJ U-Neek's solo album, "Ghetto Street Pharmacist".

He was also signed as a songwriter for Kingpin Records founder DJ U-Neek, where he wrote songs for Arista Records recording artist Angie Stone "Black Diamond" album along with other Kingpin Records artist.
He later went on to record with Capitol Records recording artist "Tracie Spencer".

References

Discogs.  "Discography: Virgil Davis Jr". Discogs.
          "Discography: Funktagious". Discogs.
AllMusic. "Credits: Virgil Davis Jr". AllMusic.

External links
http://www.discogs.com/artist/190319-Virgil-Davis www.discogs.com
http://www.allmusic.com/artist/virgil-davis-jr-mn0000212495/credits www.allmusic.com
https://www.youtube.com/watch?v=_7o_1o8Gdo8 www.youtube.com
http://www.oocities.org/sunsetstrip/club/9997/lime.html www.oocities.org

American record producers
1960 births
Living people